Running is the second studio album by American country rock group The Desert Rose Band. It was released September 6, 1988 via MCA/Curb. The album peaked at number 26 on the Top Country Albums chart.

Song information
"Summer Wind" is written about a daughter of divorced parents, who has to live with the frequent absence of her father. Chris Hillman was inspired to write "For the Rich Man" after watching the 1983 film El Norte. Hillman described "Our Songs" as a "tribute to that feeling of the '60s". He added: "I don't see the college kids addressing issues in this country."

"Homeless" tells the story of a woman and her children living on the streets. Hillman told The Tennessean in 1988: "I saw a woman who had the look in her, not of a drug addict or a mental patient, but just of a person. Steve Hill and I concocted a scenario based on that."

Track listing

Personnel

The Desert Rose Band
Bill Bryson - bass guitar, background vocals
Steve Duncan - drums, percussion, background vocals
Chris Hillman - acoustic guitar, lead vocals
John Jorgenson - bass guitar, 12-string guitar, acoustic guitar, electric guitar, mandocello, mandolin, background vocals
JayDee Maness - pedal steel guitar
Herb Pedersen - banjo, acoustic guitar, background vocals, lead vocals on "Hello Trouble"

Chart performance

References

1988 albums
The Desert Rose Band albums
MCA Records albums
Curb Records albums
Albums produced by Paul Worley